This article contains lists of named passenger trains in Italy.

Italy
 
Named passenger trains